

Cabinet
The current council, Tatar cabinet, which replaced the Erhürman cabinet is appointed on 22 May 2019 by the president, Mustafa Akıncı. The cabinet consists of 10 ministers formed by a coalition of the National Unity Party (UBP) and People's Party (HP). UBP got 7 and HP got 3 ministers in the cabinet. HP withdrew from the coalition on 6 October 2020. However, the official resignation process of the ministers and the cabinet did not proceed due to the election process.

See also 
 List of cabinets of Northern Cyprus

Notes

Cabinets of Northern Cyprus